The 2018 European Pairs Speedway Championship was the 15th edition of the European Pairs Speedway Championship. The final was held in Brovst, Denmark on 1 September. 

The title was won by Poland for the seventh time.

Final

See also 
 2018 Speedway European Championship

References 

2018
European Championship Pairs
Speedway European Championship